The King Charles Troupe (KCT or the KCs) is an American group of unicycling and basketball playing circus performers. In 1969, they became the first major African American circus act in modern American circus.

Early history and the Ringlings
The King Charles Troupe, created by Jerry King, hails from the Bronx, New York. A unicycle enthusiast all his life, Mr. King taught his son, Charles, age 6, how to ride a unicycle in the hallway of their apartment building. Kids from the neighborhood soon demanded lessons and the unique one-wheel club was formed. While practicing in Crotona Park, a basketball rolled over to one of the guys ( Albert Owens). He picked it up on his unicycle and shot it into the hoop, thus the idea of basketball on unicycle was born.

The name of the troupe was originally called the Charles Riders, for branding purposes it was later changed to the King Charles Troupe by business manager Bill Minson. Word spread about the Bronx unicyclers, and on April 14, 1968, the guys auditioned for circus producer Irvin Feld on the sidewalk of Madison Square Garden. Irvin was delighted with the act and welcomed them into Ringling Bros. and Barnum & Bailey Circus in 1969 as the first all-black act in the center ring. They performed with RBBBCircus for a consecutive 19 consecutive years as one of the longest running acts in circus history!

Later history
In 1981, KCT performed with the magicians Siegfried and Roy in their show "Beyond Belief" at The Frontier hotel in Las Vegas. Siegfried and Roy included the troupe in a number where they escorted a white showgirl down a large staircase, an act that faced "extreme disapproval" from hotel bosses, it was unheard of to mix black and white people that way. Siegfried and Roy said that

In 1996, they performed with the UniverSoul Circus.

January 12, 2020 - The King Charles Troupe, the first-all African-American group is honored to have been selected by the prestigious Circus Ring of Fame Foundation as a 2020 Inductee into the Circus Ring of Fame, an award that recognizes people/groups who have made a significant contribution to the art and culture of circus.

July 24, 2021 - The Bronx honored one of its hometown favorites, The King Charles Troupe, with a co-name street ceremony. The street name sign is called "King Charles Unicycle Troupe Way" and sits on the corner of E. 170th St. and Clinton Ave in the Bronx, NY. 1400 Clinton Ave is where Jerry King, wife Alma King, and son, Charles King all lived.

See also
Skeeter Reece, member

References

External links 
 
 The King Charles Unicycle Troupe visits MLK Elementary, video from 2013
 King Charles Troupe Memories, video from 2021

1968 establishments in New York City
Circuses
Unicycling